The Crescent were an English rock band, formed in 2000 in Huyton, Merseyside. The band comprised frontman Wayne Whitfield, guitarist Karl Rowlands, bassist Sean Longsworth and drummer Joey Harrison.

The band were noted as being "most famous for being protegees of lost La Lee Mavers".

Career

Sean Longsworth and Joey Harrison Harrison were still in their teens when they formed The Crescent. They were soon joined by guitarist Karl Rowlands. The band rehearsed with fellow Huytonian Lee Mavers, formerly of The La's, but the collaborated stalled before gigging due to Mavers' erratic personality. 

After singer-songwriter Wayne Whitfield joined the band, the band signed to Virgin Records sublabel Hut Records. Their debut single, "On The Run" made the Top 50 in the UK Singles Chart in May 2002. Two further singles followed, each reaching the UK chart, before their self-titled debut album was released in September 2002. They went on to tour across the UK, supporting other bands such as Toploader and The Bluetones.

Despite working on material for a second album, the band were dropped by Hut and split up in 2003. Whitfield now lives in Norway, and Karl Rowlands fronts Liverpool band In By Ones.

Discography

Albums

Singles

References

English indie rock groups
Musical groups from Liverpool
Musical groups established in 2000
Post-Britpop groups